The N706 or Jessore–Benapole highway or historically known as Jessore Road is a National Highway in Bangladesh. It connects Doratana, Jessore (Jessore zero point) to Benapole Border Crossing at the international border with India where it meets with NH 112.

References 

Benapole
N